The 1995 Pacific hurricane season was the least active Pacific hurricane season since 1979, and marked the beginning of a multi-decade period of low activity in the basin. Of the eleven tropical cyclones that formed during the season, four affected land, with the most notable storm of the season being Hurricane Ismael, which killed at least 116 people in Mexico. Hurricane Adolph was an early-season Category 4 hurricane. Hurricane Henriette brushed the Baja California Peninsula in early September.

The season officially started on May 15, 1995, in the Eastern Pacific, and on June 1, 1995, in the Central Pacific, and lasted until November 30, 1995. These dates conventionally delimit the period of each year when most tropical cyclones form in the northeastern Pacific Ocean. The season saw eleven tropical cyclones form, of which ten became tropical storms. Seven of these storms attained hurricane status, three of them becoming major hurricanes. There were fewer tropical storms than the average of 16, while the number of hurricanes and major hurricanes were slightly below average.

Season summary 

The Accumulated Cyclone Energy (ACE) index for the 1995 Pacific hurricane season in total was 100.2 units. Broadly speaking, ACE is a measure of the power of a tropical or subtropical storm multiplied by the length of time it existed.

The seasonal activity during 1995 was below normal, and marked the first of several seasons with lower than normal activity. Four tropical cyclones affected Mexico: first, Hurricane Flossie passed within  of Baja California Peninsula, producing moderate winds and killing seven people. Afterwards, Tropical Storm Gil dropped heavy rainfall in Southern Mexico early in its life, though caused no damage. Finally, Ismael struck the state of Sinaloa as a minimal hurricane. Offshore, fishermen were caught off guard by the hurricane, causing 57 of them to drown. On land, Ismael destroyed thousands of houses, leaving 30,000 homeless and killing another 59. Both Hurricanes Flossie and Ismael also produced moisture and localized damage in the Southwestern United States.

Activity in the Central Pacific Ocean was below normal, as well. No tropical storms formed in the basin. For the first time in four years, Barbara was the only tropical cyclone to exist within the basin, but it formed in the Eastern Pacific. It entered as a weakening tropical storm, and quickly dissipated, without affecting land. It was the least active in the basin since 1979, when the basin was completely quiet, as no storms entered the basin that year.

Systems

Tropical Depression One-E 

A westward-moving tropical wave entered the Pacific Ocean in mid-May. Convection within the disturbance became more concentrated and organized on May 19 while the wave was located a short distance south of the Gulf of Tehuantepec. Outflow increased as the storm moved through an area of warm waters and a favorable upper-level environment, and two satellite classifications indicated the system was at tropical storm status around nine hours after forming. Despite the favorable environment and satellite classifications of tropical storm status, the depression failed to organize further. The convection and organization continued to decrease, and on May 23 the depression dissipated.

Hurricane Adolph 

An area of disturbed weather associated with a tropical wave organized off the southwest coast of Mexico during the middle of June. Banding features developed as a circulation persisted on the northeast side of its deep convection, and the system developed into Tropical Depression Two-E on June 15. Under weak steering currents, the depression moved slowly northward, and with deep convection organizing near its center, the depression intensified to Tropical Storm Adolph on June 16. Located in an area of warm waters, Adolph exhibited a well-defined outflow pattern, and rapidly strengthened to attain hurricane status on June 17 as a banding-type eye developed. Hurricane Adolph turned to the northwest and attained major hurricane status late that same day. Shortly thereafter, the storm weakened, as the upper-level environment became more hostile, and the system moved over progressively cooler waters. On June 19, Adolph turned to the west, and degenerated back into a tropical storm later that day. On June 20, the storm weakened to a tropical depression, and on June 21, Adolph began to dissipate as its center became devoid of deep convection.

When the storm turned to the northwest and later to the west, the government discontinued the warnings as it was determined the storm would not be a threat to land. No damage or casualties were reported.

Hurricane Barbara 

A few days later, on June 24, another weak tropical wave moved off the coast of Africa. It moved steadily westward through the Atlantic Ocean without any development, and entered the eastern Pacific Ocean on July 5. At this point, convection developed along the wave axis, and the system gradually organized. Although the outer rainbands warmed slightly in the hours after the formation, the convection near the center deepened further with favorable upper-level outflow, and the depression strengthened into Tropical Storm Barbara early on July 8.

After moving into an area of light vertical shear and warm water temperatures, Barbara quickly intensified to reach major hurricane status on July 10. The eye continued to become better organized, and Barbara attained winds of  later on July 10. After maintaining its intensity for 24 hours, increased wind shear from an upper-tropospheric trough degraded the appearance of the deepest convection, and the eye became obscured from satellite images. After weakening to a  hurricane, Barbara maintained its intensity for 30 hours before moving into an area with very warm waters and a favorable upper-level environment. On July 13, the hurricane re-organized, a distinct eye again developed, and Barbara strengthened to reach its peak intensity of  later that day. Barbara continued westward under the influence of a subtropical ridge to its north, and began to steadily weaken on July 14 as it moved into an area of cooler water temperatures. The hurricane degraded to a tropical storm on July 16, and a day later it deteriorated to a tropical depression. Barbara remained away from land for its entire lifetime, and it did not cause any damage or deaths.

Hurricane Cosme 

As Barbara moved away from land, another area of disturbed weather moved off the coast of Central America on July 11. Moving westward, this area slowly organized, and developed a low-level circulation on July 22. As the depression was situated in an area with warm waters and moderate upper-level outflow, the system was forecast to slowly intensify to a  tropical storm. Initially, the depression followed the forecasts, and it intensified into a tropical storm about 30 hours after developing, receiving the name "Cosme". Cosme was expected to strengthen only slightly due to predicted cooler waters and increased shear.

On July 18, contrary to the predictions, Cosme became much better organized, and well-defined banding features were visible on satellite imagery. After maintaining hurricane status for 18 hours, Cosme weakened back to a tropical storm on July 20. Cooler water temperatures deteriorated the convection near the center, resulting in Cosme quickly weakening to a tropical depression on July 21. After turning to the west-southwest, Cosme dissipated on July 22. Cosme never affected land, and as a result caused no damage or fatalities.

Tropical Storm Dalila 

A tropical wave moved off the coast of Africa on July 11. It moved westward and quickly developed two areas of convection along the wave axis. One of the areas nearly developed into a tropical depression after moving northwestward, though it failed to organize further and dissipated. The southern area continued westward and ultimately entered the eastern Pacific Ocean on July 21.

Slightly strengthening occurred, and on July 25 the depression intensified into Tropical Storm Dalila. The storm turned to the northwest, and later to the west-northwest, and remained a minimal tropical storm until July 28 when a decrease in wind shear allowed Dalila to strengthen. A strong anticyclone developed to the north of the system, causing Dalila to accelerate to the northwest. Tropical Storm Dalila slowly weakened after moving over progressively cooler water temperatures, and on August 1 it degenerated into a tropical depression. Dalila turned to the southwest after much of the convection waned, and the system dissipated on August 2.

Tropical Storm Erick 

On July 17 a tropical wave exited the coast of Africa, and moved westward. An area of convection along the wave organized slightly on July 18, though the next day the convection diminished. After moving through the Windward Islands on July 23, deep convection again increased. The system failed to organize further, though convection continued to develop upon entering the eastern Pacific Ocean on July 27. The cloudiness and thunderstorms became more consolidated off the coast of southern Mexico, and on July 31 Dvorak classifications began on the system.

Initially, the depression was a small system with moderate amounts of easterly wind shear. It organized slowly, and after moving to the southwest for 24 hours it turned to the northwest. Subsequent to an increase in convection over the center, the depression intensified into Tropical Storm Erick on August 4. Operationally, the storm was forecast to continue to strengthen to reach hurricane status, though this did not occur. The mid-level ridge which had been tracking Erick westward weakened, resulting in Erick to turn to the north over cooler waters. Erick never affected land.

Hurricane Flossie 

A large circulation with an area of low pressure persisted in the tropical eastern Pacific Ocean in early August. The large circulation was well-developed by August 7, and the convection concentrated a few hundred miles southwest of Acapulco. Based on its organization, the National Hurricane Center designated the system Tropical Depression Seven-E. On August 8, the depression intensified into Tropical Storm Flossie, based on ship reports. The storm paralleled the coast of Mexico as it moved northwestward, and after a decrease of wind shear Flossie developed very deep convection over its center. After maintaining its peak intensity for 18 hours and passing within  of Baja California Peninsula, Flossie weakened over cooler waters and degenerated to a tropical storm on August 12. The storm continued to weaken, and early on August 14 Flossie dissipated.

The government of Mexico issued a tropical storm warning from Punta Tejupan to Cabo Corrientes early in its life, though it was discontinued shortly thereafter. Officials issued a tropical storm watch and later a warning for Baja California Sur south of La Paz, which was later extended from Loreto on the east coast to San Juanico on the west coast. The large circulation of Hurricane Flossie produced gusty winds along the west coast of Mexico and southern Baja California Peninsula. Seven people died in Mexico from the storm, including two that drowned in Cabo San Lucas. A monsoon surge moving around its eastern periphery produced heavy rainfall in the American Southwest. Flooding from the rainfall killed one person and left eleven motorists stranded. Thunderstorms in Tucson, Arizona, produced hurricane-force wind gusts which caused widespread power outages and damage. Damage from the storm in Arizona totaled to $5 million (1995 USD; $  USD), although damage in Mexico, if any, is unknown.

Tropical Storm Gil 

An area of disturbed weather, possibly related to a tropical wave, persisted and gradually organized in the Gulf of Tehuantepec. Operationally, it was not until 15 hours later that the National Hurricane Center initiated advisories on the system. The depression moved westward and quickly intensified into a tropical storm. A nearby ship confirmed the existence of tropical storm force winds, and Gil reached winds of  early on August 21. With well-defined outflow and continually developing convection, forecasters predicted Gil to strengthen more and attain hurricane status within two days of becoming a tropical storm. However, increased northeasterly wind shear initially prevented further strengthening.

On August 22, the cloud pattern of Gil became better organized, though the low-level circulation was located to the northeast of the deep convection due to the wind shear. The shear also limited outflow to the east, preventing further strengthening. Gradually the convection developed nearer to the center. After maintaining its peak strength for 30 hours, Gil moved over progressively cooler waters, and weakened to a tropical depression on August 26. While located a short distance off of Mexico, Gil produced heavy rainfall near the coast. However, there were no reports of casualties or damages in association with the storm.

Hurricane Henriette 

A tropical wave moved off the coast of Africa on August 15. It traversed westward and entered the eastern Pacific Ocean on August 29. Late on September 3, an eye began to form in the center of the deep convection as Henriette turned to the northwest. The hurricane quickly crossed the southern tip of Baja California Peninsula and re-emerged into the Pacific Ocean. Convection gradually waned as the hurricane moved over progressively colder waters, and on September 6 Henriette weakened to a tropical depression.

On September 2, a few hours after Henriette became a tropical storm, the government of Mexico issued tropical cyclone warnings and watches for Baja California Peninsula. The threat of Hurricane Henriette prompted a Carnival Cruise Line ship to alter their route. A strong storm surge produced flooding and heavy road damage in the state. 800 people were forced from their homes, and crop damage was reported. No damage estimates are available, and no deaths were reported.

Hurricane Ismael 

Hurricane Ismael developed from a persistent area of deep convection on September 12, and steadily strengthened as it moved to the north-northwest. Ismael rapidly weakened over land, and dissipated on September 16 over northwestern Mexico. The remnants entered the United States and extended eastward into the mid-Atlantic states.

Hundreds of fishermen were unprepared by the hurricane, which was expected to move more slowly, and as a result 52 ships were wrecked, killing 57 fishermen. The hurricane destroyed thousands of houses, leaving 30,000 people homeless. On land, Ismael caused 59 casualties in mainland Mexico and resulted in $26 million in damage (1995 USD; $  USD). Moisture from the storm extended into the United States, causing heavy rainfall and localized moderate damage in southeastern New Mexico.

Hurricane Juliette 

Hurricane Juliette was the strongest and final hurricane of the season. It formed on September 16 from a tropical wave off the southwest coast of Mexico, and moved west-northwest for the early part of its duration. Juliette was smaller than usual tropical cyclones, and as a result it intensified quickly, reaching hurricane status on September 18 and major hurricane status a day later. It subsequently began a slow weakening trend and turned toward the northeast, briefly threatening the Baja California Peninsula. Instead, strong wind shear overcame the storm, and Juliette dissipated on September 26 without significantly affecting land.

Other systems 
According to the Joint Typhoon Warning Center (JTWC), on January 4 a tropical depression formed east of the International Dateline on January 4, and three days later it exited CPHC's area of responsibility. According to the JTWC and Japan Meteorological Agency, on November 10 a tropical depression formed east of the International Dateline on November 10, and soon it exited CPHC's area of responsibility.

Storm names 
The following names were used for named storms that formed in the northeast Pacific in 1995. Names that were not assigned are marked in gray. The names not retired from this list were used again in the 2001 season. This is the same list used for the 1989 season with the exception of Wallis, which switched places with Winnie, the original "W" name on this list. The name Dalila was used for the first time in 1995; in the 1989 season, it was Dalilia, though an error in documents prior to the season changed it. The name change has remained.

For storms that form in the Central Pacific Hurricane Center's area of responsibility, encompassing the area between 140 degrees west and the International Date Line, all names are used in a series of four rotating lists. The next four names that were slated for use in 1995 are shown below, however none of them were used.

Retirement 

The World Meteorological Organization retired one name in the spring of 1996: Ismael. Originally slated to be replaced by Israel, Ismael was ultimately replaced with Ivo for the 2001 season.

Season effects 
This is a table of all the storms that formed in the 1995 Pacific hurricane season. It includes their duration, names, intensities, areas affected, damages, and death totals. Deaths in parentheses are additional and indirect (an example of an indirect death would be a traffic accident), but were still related to that storm. Damage and deaths include totals while the storm was extratropical, a wave, or a low, and all the damage figures are in 1995 USD.

See also 

 List of Pacific hurricanes
 Pacific hurricane season
 1995 Atlantic hurricane season
 1995 Pacific typhoon season
 1995 North Indian Ocean cyclone season
 South-West Indian Ocean cyclone season: 1994–95, 1995–96
 Australian region cyclone seasons: 1994–95, 1995–96
 South Pacific cyclone seasons: 1994–95, 1995–96

References

External links 
 NHC 1995 Pacific hurricane season archive
 Central Pacific Hurricane Center archive

 
Pacific hurricane seasons